Uzer may refer to the following places in France:

 Uzer, Ardèche, a commune in the department of Ardèche
 Uzer, Hautes-Pyrénées, a commune in the department of Hautes-Pyrénées

Uzer may refer to the following person:
 Turgay Uzer, Turkish born American theoretical physicist

Turkish-language surnames